Kamakhya is a Hindu goddess.

Kamakhya may also refer to:

Kamakhya, Guwahati, Assam, India
Kamakhya, A Socio-Cultural Study, a book by Nihar Ranjan Mishra

People
Kamakhya Narain Singh (1916–1970), an Indian politician and Maharaja Bahadur of Ramgarh Raj
Kamakhya Narayan Singh (born 1984), an Indian film director and writer
Kamakhya Prasad Singh Deo (born 1941), an Indian politician
Kamakhya Prasad Tasa (born 1975), an Indian politician